Marge is a feminine given name.

Marge may also refer to:

 Marge (cartoonist), pen name of American cartoonist Marjorie Henderson Buell (1904–1993), creator of Little Lulu
 Margarine, called marge in Britain and Australia
 Tropical Storm Marge (disambiguation), various tropical storms and typhoons
 La Marge (English: The Margin (novel)), a 1967 novel by André Pieyre de Mandiargues
 La Marge (English: The Margin (film)), a 1976 French erotic film adaptation of the novel starring Sylvia Kristel
 Marge Records, a French jazz record label, now renamed Futura Marge

See also
 
 Marj (disambiguation)